Originally started in the UK, the Girls' (and Boys') Night In collections gather together hip fiction for the twenty- and thirtysomething sets. The United States version collects 21 stories from such popular chick-lit authors as Meg Cabot, Alisa Valdes-Rodriguez, Isabel Wolff, Anna Maxted, and Lisa Jewell.

Chapters
Party Planner by Meg Cabot
Traveling Light by Carole Matthews
Cat Lady by Alisa Valdes-Rodriguez
Changing People by Sophie Kinsella
New York by Jill Davis
Revenge by Emily Barr
Here Comes Harry by Jessica Adams
Know it All by Sarah Mlynowski
In Agony by Isabelle Wolff
Dating the Enemy by Lauren Henderson
From This Moment by Megan McCafferty
What Goes Around by Louise Bagshawe
Rudy by Lisa Jewel
The Truth is Out There by Marian Keyes
Here We Are by Linda Curnyn
Siren Songs by Stella Duffy
The Marrying Kind by Anna Maxted
Don't You Know Who I Am by Adele Lang
Good Men by Jennifer Weiner
Dougie, Spoons, and the Aquarium Solarium by Jenny Colgan
Acting Strangely by Chris Manby

References

2004 anthologies
Chick lit
Fiction anthologies